Theodora of Bulgaria (Bulgarian and ) was a Bulgarian princess and Queen consort of Serbia, the first wife of Stefan Dečanski. Teodora was the second daughter of Tsar Smilets of Bulgaria and Smiltsena Palaiologina. Teodora is best remembered as a patron of the Arts, Music and Literature. Among her heirloom, one of the most famous rings from the fourteenth century was found, now on display in the National Museum in Belgrade. That golden ring has the carved inscription: "May the Lord help the one who wears it."

Queenship

Teodora married Serbian crown prince (later king) Stefan Uroš III (called Dečanski) on 24 August 1296. They had two children: future Tsar (Emperor) Stefan Dušan and Dušica.

In 1314 her husband's father Stefan Milutin quarreled with Stefan, and sent him to Constantinople to be blinded. Teodora and the family went with him and established a household there until 1320 when they were allowed to return.

Later life
She was present at the state assembly of 6 January 1322, when her son Dušan was crowned Young king. In this period, Dečanski and Teodora were divorced. It is very likely that, between the death of Milutin (29 October 1321) and the crowning of Dušan, it was decided that Teodora be divorced from her husband due to the fact that Teodora's father's family had by then been expelled from Bulgaria, and Dečanski sought to empower himself by marrying into the Byzantine royal family. He then married Maria Palaiologina.

It is still unknown when Teodora died.  She was alive on 6 January 1322, and according to M. Vukićević and S. Ćosović died prior to January 1323. Historian Stojan Novaković earlier based the death in the winter of 1322–23 on the talks of Dečanski marrying Phillip of Tarento  in the beginning of 1323. Other believe she lived longer, possibly marrying Jovan Dragoslav between 1322 and 1326. It is believed she was buried in the Banjska monastery.

References

Sources
 
 

13th-century Bulgarian people
14th-century Bulgarian people
14th-century Serbian royalty
Serbian queens consort
Bulgarian princesses
Medieval Serbian royal consorts
People of the Kingdom of Serbia (medieval)
Smilets dynasty
Year of birth unknown
1322 deaths
14th-century Bulgarian women
13th-century Bulgarian women
14th-century Serbian people
14th-century Serbian women
Daughters of emperors